Ángel Albino Corzo International Airport , also known as Tuxtla Gutierrez International Airport, is an international airport serving the Mexican municipality of Chiapa de Corzo, Chiapas. It handles air traffic for the city of Tuxtla Gutiérrez and central Chiapas, including the popular tourist destination of San Cristóbal de las Casas.

It was inaugurated by President Vicente Fox and by the State's Governor Pablo Salazar Mendiguchía on June 27, 2006, replacing the Francisco Sarabia National Airport. It is operated by Grupo Aeroportuario de Chiapas, a government-owned corporation.

The airport was originally designed with a capacity to handle 350 daily operations and 850,000 passengers per year, it comprises a concrete runway, a parallel taxiway, several hangars, a commercial aviation apron, a general aviation apron, a military base, and a state-of-the-art commercial terminal equipped with six glass jetways, two of which are capable of handling medium-large airliners such as the Boeing 767 and Airbus A330. To improve the airport's capacity, the operator invested 440 million MXP to expand and modernize all installations. Works were completed in December 2020, expanding its surface by 140% for a total of 22,472 m2 and increasing the contact positions to 8 jetways.

According to official statistics provided by the Civil Aviation Federal Agency (AFAC), in 2021 the airport handled 1,186,528 passengers, and 1,590,178 in 2022, an increase of 34.02%. It is the largest in the Southwestern region and among the Top 15 busiest in the country. The airport reached the million-passenger milestone for the first time on November 28, 2015.

Airlines and destinations

Passengers

Traffic statistics

Busiest routes

See also

 List of the busiest airports in Mexico

References

External links
 Grupo Aeroportuario de Chiapas
 Tuxtla Gutiérrez Airport

Airports in Chiapas
Airports established in 2006
2006 establishments in Mexico
Tuxtla Gutiérrez